Grace Adelbert Sandhouse (1896–1940) was an American entomologist.

Life and career
Sandhouse was raised in Monticello, Iowa.
She attended the University of Colorado, where she graduated in 1920, while working for Theodore Cockerell. Cockerell introduced Sandhouse to apiology, the study of bees. She proceeded to get her Masters from the University of Colorado and her PhD at Cornell University. After graduation she became a Junior Entomologist at the United States Department of Agriculture's Bureau of Entomology, working in the Division of Insect Identification. She worked there until her death, ending her career as an Associate Entomologist.

Research wise, Sandhouse focused on taxonomy of Hymenoptera, specifically Apoidea. She published a monograph on the genus Osmia. Sandhouse's personal archives are in the collection of the Smithsonian Institution Archives.

Publications
The North American bees of the genus Osmia (Hymenoptera: Apoidea). Washington, D.C.: The Entomological society of Washington (1939)
"A Review of the Nearctic Wasps of the Genus Trypoxylon (Hymenoptera: Sphecidae)". American Midland Naturalist, Vol. 24, No. 1 (Jul., 1940), pp. 133–176. 
The Type Species of the Genera and Subgenera of Bees. Washington, D.C.: Smithsonian Institution Press (1943)
The bees of the genus Agapostemon (Hymenoptera: Apoidea) occurring in the United States. Bureau of Entomology and Plant Quarantine (1936)

References

1896 births
1940 deaths
American entomologists
Women entomologists
Cornell University College of Agriculture and Life Sciences alumni
People from Monticello, Iowa
United States Department of Agriculture officials
University of Colorado alumni
20th-century American women scientists
20th-century American zoologists